The United States Digital Service is a technology unit housed within the Executive Office of the President of the United States. It provides consultation services to federal agencies on information technology. It seeks to improve and simplify digital service, and to improve federal websites. It was launched on August 11, 2014.

Activities
The US Digital Service has created:

 A Digital Services Playbook, for improving digital government
 Draft Web Design Standards, "to build accessible, mobile-friendly government websites"
 TechFAR Handbook, on federal contracting and procurement
Discovery Sprint Guide

The United States Digital Service sends a report to Congress each year detailing its projects and accomplishments. Its federal agency work spans across the Veterans Affairs, Department of Defense, Small Business Administration, General Services Administration, Department of Homeland Security, Department of Education, and Health and Human Services.

History
The United States Digital Service was the idea of Jennifer Pahlka, Chief Technology Officer of the United States. Pahlka's goal was to create an elite government technology unit at the White House that would be equivalent to the United Kingdom's Government Digital Service. 

The first head of the United States Digital Digital Service was Mikey Dickerson, a former Google engineer who was involved in the 2013–14 rescue of HealthCare.gov website. He was succeeded by Matt Cutts, who was in that position until April 2021. 

The third administrator of the United States Digital Service was Mina Hsiang. During the Biden administration, Hsiang led the United States Digital Digital Service in deploying a new website about COVID-19 vaccines, Vaccines.gov. 

In 2021, United States Digital Service employed 215 people and was looking to expand further.

See also 
 18F, at the General Services Administration
US Digital Corps
 United Kingdom Government Digital Service

References

External links 
 

2014 establishments in the United States
Executive Office of the President of the United States
Government agencies established in 2014
Information technology in the United States
Open government in the United States
Organizations based in Washington, D.C.